Notholepthyphantes is a genus of South American dwarf spiders that was first described by Alfred Frank Millidge in 1985.

Species
 it contains two species:
Notholepthyphantes australis (Tullgren, 1901) (type) – Chile
Notholepthyphantes erythrocerus (Simon, 1902) – Chile

See also
 List of Linyphiidae species (I–P)

References

Araneomorphae genera
Linyphiidae
Spiders of South America
Endemic fauna of Chile